Beddomeia launcestonensis is a species of very small freshwater snail that has a gill and an operculum, an aquatic operculate gastropod mollusk in the family Hydrobiidae. This species is endemic to Australia.

The Beddomeia launcestonensis is a freshwater snail of the Beddomeia genus, the most diverse of all freshwater families of freshwater molluscs, and Hydrobiidae family. 
There are approximately 67 species within this hydrobiid and four distinct genera within this Beddomeia complex. Three species in the genera (Nanocochlea; three taxa, Phrantela; thirteen taxa, and Beddomeia; forty-seven taxa) are found in Tasmania, whereas the fourth genus (Victodrobia; four taxa) is endemic to Victoria. Only three of these taxa have been given subspecific status, whereas fifty-nine of the species-group taxa are newly described. These species-group taxa are segregated through the use of morphological data based on 78 characters from the radula, shell, genital and non-genital anatomy.
Nearly the entirety of this taxa have very specific and small geographic ranges with 38 being known only from single locations.

Freshwater snails are gastropod molluscs which live in brackish water or fresh water. According to a 2008 review of the taxonomy, there are about 4,000 species of freshwater gastropods, inclusive of the Beddomeia launcestonensis.
The Beddomeia launcestonensis is small in size with a shell ranging from 2 to 4.2 mm in length. They make up part of approximately 47 species of the Tasmanian snail Beddomeia genus, residing mainly in the mid-north and north-eastern parts of Tasmania.

They were first identified by R. M Johnston and originally named Amnicola launcestonensis in 1879. Now known as Beddomeia launcestonensis, this species is currently found on the Tasmanian Threatened species of Invertebrate Animals as Endangered and are classified as endangered on the Threatened Species Protection Act 1995. They are endemic in Tasmania and restricted in abundance and distribution.

Anatomy
B. launcestonensis, similarly to all beddomeid snails are small in size, ranging between 2 and 4.2 mm in maximum length and with a width/length ratio ranging between 0.8 and 0.9 mm. Due to their small sizer and cryptic nature, there is little known about the biology of hydrobiid snails such as Beddomeia launcestonensis, or other closely related species. 
It can be hard to distinguish between these species even with analysis of anatomical characteristics and shell morphology. This way of classification by morphological taxonomy has been the main method of classification previously but in recent years DNA sequencing and allozyme electrophoresis have been implemented to assist in more accurate classification. This includes the investigation into the genetic variation among populations of freshwater snails, such as the variation between the species found in Tasmania; the Pseudotricula, Nanocochlea, Austropyrgus and Beddomeia species.

Beddomeia launcestonensis has a gill and an operculum as well as a unique, globular shell shape. They also differ to other close species by their shell structure and by their wider and thicker inner lip.

The male penis of Beddomeia launcestonensis is simple, however the male mantle cavity, containing the hypobranchial gland usually contains irregular and inconsistent ridging. The male genital system also includes an elongated, pyriform prostate gland.
The female genital anatomy contains a simple ventral channel with seminal receptacle at the ventral edge of the bursa copulatrix. This bursa copulatrix is characteristically small but is in alignment with the overall small scale of the organism.

Distribution and Habitat
B. launcestonensis are part of major radiation of 67 freshwater hydrobiid snails that can be found both in Eastern Victoria and in the mid-north and north-east of Tasmania. Along with Phrantela (13 taxa) and Nanocochlea (three taxa), Beddomeia (47 taxa) can be found in Tasmania alone. The individual taxa of these genus’ are seen to occupy very specific and small range of habitats and can be found in a diverse range of environments from caves to river to springs. 
Their habitat specifically includes the main river channel and the associated scour pools. They can be found located underneath rocks and boulders both in still water and under strong flow.

The Beddomeia species are obligately aquatic and dioecious, meaning their capacity for dispersal is highly limited. The areas which they are found to occupy are highly diverse but are frequently seen to be the ones that are least protected. Man made changes to the environment threaten viability of populations such as Beddomeia launcestonensis.

The identified habitat range of Beddomeia launcestonensis is very limited, with only a few known sites along a 5 km stretch of the river under Trevallyn Dam. They can also be located across some parts of Cataract Gorge and Lake Trevallyn in Launceston. 
Due to its specific habitat requirements, it is unlikely that the Beddomeia launcestonensis will extend their range outside of the current known range. (Threatened Species Section. 2021) The Beddomeia launcestonensis resides under stone slabs and large rocks that can be found deep in parts of rivers.

Historical biogeographical barriers can explain small species ranges, however, for species with limited dispersal capabilities modern habitat barriers could provide reasoning for prevented migration of species such as Beddomeia launcestonensis.
Long-term permanency of this habitat is crucial for the existence of the Beddomeia launcestonensis as it is highly dependent on specific water chemistry, geology, local hydrological conditions, rainfall and the structural nature of the non-aquatic environment surrounding.

Lifecycle and Conservation Efforts
As all species of Beddomeia, in particular Beddomeia launcestonensis, there are restricted ranges to their habitats, and they are found to be geographically isolated. Most species can be found on the Tasmanian Threatened Species list of Invertebrate Animals. A combination of intrinsic and extrinsic factors has been found to impact their population status. These include physiological attributes, dispersal ability, habitat availability, habitat preference, abiotic and biotic interactions. This not only affects the distribution of a taxon (in this case llBeddomeia launcestonensisll) but also its potential for reproduction and differentiation.

One of the few habitats of the Beddomeia launcestonensis, Cataract Gorge, has been identified by the “Environmental Review and Community Consultation processes of the Water Management Review for the South Esk” to have a number of issues with environmental health and water quality. This has a direct effect on the threatened species, B. launcestonensis and the water quality of their habitat. The existence of this taxa is placing dependency on the hydrological conditions of the environment. Damage to the stream habitat through forestry and agricultural activities could alter flow regimes and place further strain on the population. (Threatened Species Section. 2021)

Another factor impacting the population and population distribution of Beddomeia launcestonensis is its vulnerability to competition with Potamopyrgus antipodarum, the exotic species of New Zealand hydrobiid snail. Even though it is native to New Zealand and can be found throughout the country, it is often considered an invasive species that has been introduced to a multitude of other countries, including the USA and Europe. This is due to the snail’s ability to reach great densities. It places a strain on the population of the Beddomeia launcestonensis mainly due to the competition for food and habitat as the Potamopyrgus antipodarum often reaches enormous population densities that the Beddomeia launcestonensis cannot compete with.

Efforts are being made by the Department of Primary Industries, Parks, Water and Environment, Tasmania to educate the population on potential risks that may endanger the existence of B. launcestonensis with rules and regulations being orchestrated to enable the conservation of the species and its environment. 
The community is instructed to not remove or burn streamside vegetation upstream or around known localities.
The Tasmanian population are also encouraged to always report any observations of the species to the DPIPWE Natural Values Atlas, or to provide the information directly to the Threatened Species Section. All records of the species are considered vital for providing information on abundance and distribution of the species.

The main management plans for the conservation of Beddomeia launcestonensis include the prevention of the degradation of habitat and raising community awareness of the species.

See also
List of non-marine molluscs of Australia

References

Bibliography
Davies, PE and Cook, LSJ. “The Cataract Snail – B. launcestonensis: status, management and critical habitats”. Academic Report. Freshwater Systems & Hydro Australia. 17 October 2017. The University of Tasmania. https://eprints.utas.edu.au/414/  1
Davies, PE. “South Esk – Great Lake Water Management Review: Scientific Report on Cataract Gorge. Academic Report. Freshwater Systems & Hydro Australia. 2019. The University of Tasmania https://agris.fao.org/agris-search/search.do?recordID=AU2019400605
Ponder W.F; Clark. “Beddomeia Launcestonensis (Johnston, 1879)”. Museums Victoria Collection. https://collections.museumsvictoria.com.au/specimens/637037 Accessed 22 March 2021. 1
Ponder W.F; Clark G.A; Miller AC; Toluzzi A. (1993). “Invertebrate Taxonomy”. Vol.7, Issue 3, p. 501-750. https://www.publish.csiro.au/is/IT9930501
Ponder W.F; Colgan D.J. (2002). “What makes a narrow-range taxon? Insights from Australian freshwater snails”. Invertebrate Systematics. Vol. 16, Issue 4, p. 571. CSIRO publishing journals. https://www.publish.csiro.au/is/it01043
Threatened Species Section (2021) "Beddomeia launcestonensis (Hydrobiid Snail (Cataract Gorge)): Species Management Profile for Tasmania’s Threatened Species Link.”  Department of Primary Industries, Parks, Water and Environment, Tasmania.  https://www.threatenedspecieslink.tas.gov.au/Pages/Hydrobiid-Snail-(Cataract-Gorge).aspx. Accessed 22 March 2021.
Richards K. “An Ecological, Morphological and Molecular Investigation of Beddomeia Species (Gastropoda: Hydrobiidae) in Tasmania. Academic Journal; Thesis. University of Tasmania. September 2010.  https://eprints.utas.edu.au/10755/2/richards-whole-thesis.pdf
Ponder, W. F., Hallan, A., Shea, M. E., Clark, S. A., Richards, K., Klunzinger, M. W., and Kessner, V. 2020. Australian Freshwater Molluscs. Revision 1. https://keys.lucidcentral.org/keys/v3/freshwater_molluscs/key/australian_freshwater_molluscs/Media/Html/entities/beddomeia_launcestonensis.htm 8

External links

Gastropods of Australia
Hydrobiidae
Beddomeia
Vulnerable fauna of Australia
Endemic fauna of Australia
Gastropods described in 1879
Taxonomy articles created by Polbot
Freshwater molluscs of Oceania